Njeim is a Lebanese Maronite Christian surname meaning "small star". Notable people with the surname include:

Chirine Njeim (born 1984), Lebanese alpine skier and long-distance runner
Jean Njeim (1915-1971), Lebanese Army general
Nadine Wilson Njeim (born 1988), Lebanese beauty queen
Nadine Nassib Njeim (born 1984), Lebanese actress

See also
Najm